Jakob Hlasek and Marc Rosset were the defending champions, but lost in the first round to Luke Jensen and Murphy Jensen.

Jacco Eltingh and Paul Haarhuis won the title by defeating Wayne Ferreira and Mark Kratzmann 6–4, 7–6 in the final.

Seeds

Draw

Finals

Top half

Bottom half

References

External links
 Official results archive (ATP)
 Official results archive (ITF)

Men's Doubles